Semaphore is the second studio album by Fridge, released in March 1998.

Critical reception
NME wrote: "Fridge have created an album that is deceptive; minimal and monotonous, you coast through a series of seemingly pointless guitar-bass-and-drums instrumentals like 'Teletexed' and 'Chroma' before being softened up for the nerve-rattling sax on the Faust-like 'Low Fat Diet', or the sand-in-your-joints noise of 'Stamper'." The Independent thought that "although there is much rhythmic intrigue here, sometimes the impression is left that the knobs and buttons on synthesizers dictate the melodies."

Track listing

 "Cassette" (1:23)
 "Furniture Boy" (7:09)
 "A Slow" (4:13)
 "Motorbus" (7:27)
 "Teletexed" (4:06)
 "Chroma" (6:08)
 "Lo Fat Diet" (6:37)
 "Swerve And Spin" (4:07)
 "Curdle" (4:53)
 "Lign" (0:18)
 "Stamper" (4:56)
 "There Is No Try" (1:19)
 " Knight" (8:32)

References

1998 albums
Fridge (band) albums